This is a bibliography of selected publications on the history of the United States.

Books
 
 
 
 
 
 
 
 
 
 
 
 
 
 
 
 
 
 
 
 
 
 
 
 
  in

Surveys

Primary sources 
 
 
 
 

United States
United States
History of the United States